Forest Essentials is an Indian cosmetics, skincare and perfume company that specialises in Ayurvedic preparations for its products. It was founded in 2000 by Mira Kulkarni in New Delhi, India.

History 
Mira Kulkarni started the business in 2000 with an investment of Rs.2 lakhs, then only selling handmade soaps and candles. The business expanded after the Delhi hotel Hyatt Regency ordered the soaps for their rooms. In 2005–2006, the company posted sales of Rs.6 crore.

Business 
In 2008, the New York-based Estée Lauder Companies acquired a 20% stake in the company, and in October 2021, the brand announced entering the United Kingdom by opening 12 retail stores. Kulkarni's son Samrath Bedi currently serves as the managing director of the company.

The company has 115 stores in India, supplies to 190 hotels and export to 120 countries. The factories are in Haridwar and Lodsi in Tehri Garhwal district, Uttarakhand.

Forest Essentials sells natural, organic and Ayurvedic cosmetics and has a policy of not testing their products on animals.

In November 2022, Forrest Essentials opened its first standalone store in Covent Garden, London which would become the brand's first international store.

References

External links 
 

Manufacturing companies established in 2000
Personal care brands
Cosmetics brands
Cosmetics companies of India
Indian companies established in 2000
Estée Lauder Companies
Luxury brands
Ayurvedic companies
Indian brands